James Gray (1820 – 21 January 1889) was an Australian politician.

Gray was born in Ballybay in County Monaghan in 1820. In 1843 he was found guilty of subornation to perjury and transported to Tasmania, where he arrived in 1844. He received his ticket of leave in 1847 and became a free man in 1853. In 1872 he was elected to the Tasmanian House of Assembly, representing the seat of West Hobart. He served until 1877. He later represented Sorell from 1882 until his death in 1889.

References

1820 births
1889 deaths
Members of the Tasmanian House of Assembly
Convicts transported to Australia